Rachel Elizabeth Wilkes (born 14 February 1976) is a former Australian diver. She competed in the women's 3 metre springboard event at the 1992 Summer Olympics. Additionally, Wilkes took part in two events at the 1994 Commonwealth Games.

References

External links

1976 births
Living people
Australian female divers
Divers at the 1992 Summer Olympics
Olympic divers of Australia
Divers at the 1994 Commonwealth Games
Commonwealth Games competitors for Australia
20th-century Australian women
21st-century Australian women